The Warwickshire Cricket League is the biggest cricket league for clubs in Warwickshire.  Its origins go back to 1989, and since 1998 it has acted as a feeder league to the Birmingham and District Premier League
Aston Manor in 2005, Berkswell in 2006, & Sutton Coldfield 2014 gained successive promotions from Birmingham League Division Three the following season. Coventry and North Warwickshire Cricket Club are the current champions.

From 2018 following an ECB-led revamp. The Warwickshire League became the Warwickshire County League and now sits on (Tier 3) of the club cricket structure as opposed to (Tier 5) beforehand.

Premier League Teams (2021) (This includes two clubs who won the Birmingham and District Premier League in the past Coventry & NW in 1991 & Stratford CC in 2000).

Winners of the Warwickshire Cricket League (Since 2000)

2000: Tamworth
2001: Old Edwardians
2002: Dorridge
2003: Olton and West Warwickshire
2004: Aston Manor
2005: Berkswell
2006: Olton and West Warwickshire
2007: Bablake Old Boys
2008: Moseley Ashfield
2009: Bablake Old Boys
2010: Handsworth
2011: Streetly
2012: Kings Heath
2013: Sutton Coldfield
2014: Aston Manor
2015: Handsworth
2016: Macca and Rowey
2017: Rugby
2018: Bedworth
2019: Walmley
2020: Coventry & NW (Winner of a Play off vs Moseley Ashfield)
2021: Stratford
2022: Coventry & NW

Divisional structure (2022 Season)

The Warwickshire Cricket league is split into a number of divisions. At the end of 2018 due to changes to the Recreational game from ECB a number of Birmingham League sides were moved down to the Warwickshire League and largely formed the Premier Division with the top 4 of the 2018 Warwickshire premier division teams.

(P) = Promoted
(R) = Relegated
(N) = New Side/Club into Warwickshire League System

Premier Division                                                                                
Aston Manor (P)
Attock
Bedworth
Bablake Old Boys
Coventry & North Warwickshire
Moseley Ashfield
Olton & West Warwickshire (P)
Rugby
Solihull Municipal
Stratford Upon Avon
Sutton Coldfield
Walmley

Division 1 
Barby (R) 
Handsworth
Hampton & Solihull
Kenilworth
Kings Heath(P)
Knowle & Dorridge 2nd XI (P)
Leamington Spa 2nd XI
Nether Whitacre
Nuneaton
Solihull Blossomfield
Standard
Streetly (R)

Division 2 
Corley (P)
Coventry and NW 2nd XI
Earlswood
Four Oaks Saints (R)
Fillongley (R)
Harborne 2nd XI (P)
Kenilworth Wardens 2nd XI
Marston Green
Pak Shaheen 
RMCC
Studley
Walmley 2nd XI

Division 3 
Attock 2nd XI (R) 
Berkswell 2nd XI
Bronze
Dunlop Pak Stars
Knowle Village
Lyndworth
Moseley 2nd XI
Sheldon Marlborough
Water Orton (R)
Ward End Unity (P) 
Warwick (P)
Wishaw

Division 4
Aston Manor 2nd XI (P)
Bedworth 2nd XI
Castle Bromwich 
Dorridge 2nd XI
Leamington Khalsa 
Oakfield and Rowlands (P)
Old Edwardians
Olton & West Warwickshire 2nd XI
Smethwick 2nd XI (R)
Stockton Star
Stratford Upon Avon 2nd XI
Weoley Hill (R)

Division 5
Ambleside
Aston Unity (R)
Atherstone Town
Bulkington (P)
Copsewood WiW  (P)
Knowle & Dorridge 3rd XI
Nuneaton 2nd XI
Old Edwardians 2nd XI
Rugby 2nd XI (R)
Streetly 2nd XI
Sutton Coldfield 2nd XI
Thimblemill

Division 6 East
Bablake 2nd XI (R)
Corley 2nd XI
Dunlop Pak Stars 2nd XI
Hunningham (R)
Knowle Village 2nd XI (P) 
Massey Ferguson
Pak Shaheen 2nd XI
Peugeot Coventry & NW 3rd XI
RMCC 2nd XI
Standard 2nd XI
Warwick 2nd XI (P)
Wilnecote

Division 6 West
Attock 3rd XI
Bridge Trust Old Boys
Earlswood 2nd XI
Four Oaks Saints 2nd XI
Handsworth 2nd XI (R)
Kings Heath 2nd XI
Lyndworth 2nd XI
Old Edwardians 2nd XI (R)
Olton & WW 2nd XI (P)
Solihull Blossomfield 2nd XI (P)
Walmley 3rd XI
Wishaw 2nd XI

Division 7 East
Attleborough (R)
Bablake 3rd XI
Barby 2nd XI (P) 
Bedworth 3rd XI (P)
Berkswell 3rd XI (P)
Coleshill
Fillongley 2nd XI
Kenilworth 2nd XI
Leamington Khalsa 2nd XI
Massey Ferguson 2nd XI
Newdigate (P)
Nether Whitacre 2nd XI
Stockton Star 2nd XI
Wolvey (R)

Division 7 West
Attock 4th XI (P)
Aston Unity 2nd XI (P) 
Catherine De Barnes 
Hampton & Solihull 2nd XI
Lyndworth 3rd XI (P)
Moseley 3rd XI 
Pickwick (R)
Sheldon Marlborough 2nd XI (R)
Shenley Fields
Solihull Municipal 2nd XI
Sutton Coldfield 3rd XI (P)
Weoley Hill 2nd XI

Division 8 Birmingham
Bournville                                     
Kings Heath 3rd XI
Knowle & Dorridge 4th XI (R)
Moseley 4th XI (P)
Moseley Ashfield 3rd XI
Pickwick Post & Mail 2nd XI
Selly Park (P) 
Solihull Blossomfield 3rd XI
Solihull Municipal 3rd XI
Smethwick 3rd XI
Studley 2nd XI (R)
Weoley Hill 3rd XI (P)

Division 8 South & Central
Alvis 
Bablake 3rd XI
Copsewood & West Indian Wanderers 2nd XI
Dorridge 3rd XI (P)
Hunningham 2nd XI
Knowle Village 3rd XI (P)
Massey Ferguson 2nd XI
Newbold 
Oakfield & Rowlands 3rd XI
Peugeot & CNW 3rd XI (P)
Rugby 3rd Xi
Olton & West Warwickshire 4th XI

Division 8 North East
Ambleside 2nd XI
Ansley Sports
Atherstone Town 2nd XI
Bedworth 4th XI (P)
Griff & Coton
Oakfield & Rowlands 2nd XI
Nuneaton 3rd XI
Stockingford
Water Orton 2nd XI (R)
Willow (P)

Division 8 North West
Aston Manor 3rd XI (R)
Bronze 2nd XI (R)
Castle Bromwich 2nd XI
Coleshill 2nd XI (P) 
Four Oaks Saints 3rd XI
Handsworth 3rd XI (P)
Marston Green 2nd XI
Thimblemill 2nd XI
Walmley 4th XI
Ward End Unity 2nd XI

Division 9 Birmingham
Catherine De Barnes 2nd Xi
Earlswood 5th XI
Hampton & Solihull 3rd XI
Hockley Heath (N)
Kings Heath 4th XI
Moseley Ashfield 4th XI
Olton & West Warwickshire 5th
Solihull Blossomfield 4th XI (P)
Sheldon Marlborough 3rd XI 
Shenley Fields 2nd XI (R) 
Walmley 5th Xi

Division 9 South Central
Alvis 2nd XI (N)
Bablake 4th XI
Berkswell 4th XI
Coleshill 3rd XI (N) 
Copsewood 3rd XI
Dorridge 4th XI (N)
Earlswood 5th XI 
Lapworth 3rd XI
Oakfield & Rowlands 3rd XI
Rugby 4th XI (N) 
RMCC 3rd XI
Standard 3rd XI

Division 9 North East
Ambleside 3rd XI
Ambleside 4th XI
Atherstone Town 3rd XI
Bulkington 2nd XI
Collycroft 
Corley 3rd XI (R)
Fillongley 3rd XI
Griff & Coton 2nd XI 
Griff & Coton 3rd XI (N) 
Newdigate 2nd XI
Nuneaton 4th XI
Wilnecote 2nd XI

Division 9 North West
Aston Unity 3rd XI
Bridge Trust Old Boys 2nd XI (R)
Four Oaks Saints 4th XI
Nether Whitacre 3rd XI
Smethwick 4th XI
Streetly 3rd XI
Sutton Coldfield 4th XI
Walmley 6th XI
Water Orton 3rd XI
Wishaw 3rd XI (R)

External links
Official League Website

English domestic cricket competitions